Kochavva Paulo Ayyappa Coelho is a 2016 Indian Malayalam-language comedy drama film written and directed by Sidhartha Siva. It is produced by Kunchacko Boban, who also stars in the title role Kochavva along with Master Rudraksh Sudheesh as Ayyappa Das; the film marks the return of Udaya Pictures, the first ever film production company in Malayalam cinema, after 30 years. The film was released during the festival of Onam, on 9 September 2016 and received a positive response from the audience. 

The film's title is inspired by Brazilian novelist Paulo Coelho, and a central theme used in this film is inspired from his novel, The Alchemist.

Plot 
Ayyappa aka Appu wishes to fly in an airplane but it hasn't been fulfilled despite coming very close to getting on to a plane a couple of times. When his father, who works in the Gulf, sends tickets, he is unable to go as he gets chickenpox. The next time he gets an opportunity, news of his father's death in a road accident reaches home just a day before the flight.

Kochavva, on the other hand, is a villager who likes to teach kids cycling and swimming in his free time. He uses The Alchemist quote to motivate the children. Appu is scared of the water but when he hears Kochavva arguing that swimming is popular internationally and that there are clubs in the cities that sponsor promising swimmers to take part in international competitions, he realises swimming can get him a ticket to fly. Slowly, he begins to learn the sport in all earnestness.

Kochavva is unaware of the reason behind Appu's transformation. When he does learn about it, he feels very guilty and tries to dissuade the boy by saying that he may have said things casually and that such clubs do not exist in reality. This has a devastating effect on the child, and it makes Kochavva want to help him. From here on we see Kochavva going in search for such a club and finally finding one in Bengaluru. Then starts the journey of the two to realise the boy's dream.

Cast

Kunchako Boban as Ajaya Kumar (Kochavva)
Master Rudraksh Sudheesh as Ayyappa Das (Appu)
Miss Abeni Aadhi as Ambili
Anusree as Anju Mol
Nedumudi Venu as Appooppan Thambi
K. P. A. C. Lalitha as Ammoomma Sri Latha
Muthumani as Girija
Mukesh as Sreekumar
Suraj Venjaramood as Susheelan Kochettan
Sudheesh as Reji
Aju Varghese as Rajeev
Musthafa as Saji
Irshad as Mohandas (Omanakuttan)
Maniyanpilla Raju as Maniyanpillai
Mithun Ramesh as Sugunan
Biju Menon as Airline passenger (Cameo appearance)
Parvathy Ratheesh as Journalist (Cameo appearance)

Production
It is 87th production of Udaya and 75th film acted by Kunchacko Boban. He has already announced that fifty percentage of profit from the film will be spend for charity. The movie was extensively shot in Bangalore, Pollachi, Adimaly, Thiruvananthapuram, and Perumbavoor.

KPAC was planned to complete filming in four schedules. The filming began on 14 March 2016 in Adimaly, Kerala. After a break, the second schedule started in Adimaly in April 2016. By late June 2016, the crew finished filming their Thiruvananthapuram schedules and shifted to Perumbavoor.

Release
The film released on 9 September 2016 in more than 80 screens in Kerala, on the occasion of Onam.

Critical response
The Times of India gave it 4 out of 5 and wrote "The story has what it takes to leave the viewers buoyed by satisfaction at the end and is also guaranteed to bring some tears to their eyes". Deccan Chronicle gave the film 3.5 out of 5 and stated "Though motivational in outlook, Sidhartha makes it lively through humour and twists. Kochavva Paulo Ayyappa Coelho is a good example of how a National Award winner can shake off the tag to come up with a good commercial entertainer". Manorama Online rated the film 3 out of 5 stars saying that "Kochavva Paulo Ayyappa Coelho is a feel-good movie". Filmi Beat gave it 3.5 out of 5 and wrote "KPAC is a decent entertainer which deals with a very simple plot and narrates it in a very beautiful manner. Kudos to the director Sidhartha Siva, for excellently portraying the viewpoint of children and making the complete use of the talents of his actors and this film is a perfect classy entertainer for this Onam season. Don't miss this one". Onlookers Media rated the film 7 out of 10 stars saying that "Kochavva Paulo Ayyappa Coelho is a feel-good simple entertainer which gives you a message about life. It is based on the famous words of Paulo Coelho which he said in his book The Alchemist. If you love simple and class movies, KPAC is a good one for you. Go without the burden of expectation and it will be a satisfying experience for you".

Soundtrack
Music: Shaan Rahman, Sooraj S. Kurup, Lyrics: Vayalar Sarathchandra Varma, Vishal Johnson, Manu Manjith, Sooraj S. Kurup

 "Ethu Meghamaari" - Hesham Abdul Wahab
 "Mele Mukilodum" - Shaan Rahman, Job Kurian
 "Neelakkannula Maane" - Vijay Yesudas, Shweta Mohan
 "Vaanam Mele" - Shankar Mahadevan

References

External links

2016 films
Films set in Kerala
Films shot in Kerala
Films shot in Bangalore
Films shot in Pollachi
Films shot in Kochi
Films shot in Munnar
Films shot in Thiruvananthapuram
2010s Malayalam-language films
Films scored by Shaan Rahman
Films scored by Sooraj S. Kurup
Films directed by Sidhartha Siva